Crusafontia is an extinct genus of mammal from the Cretaceous Camarillas, El Castellar and La Huérguina Formations of Spain. The name of the animal was given in honour of the Spanish paleontologist Miquel Crusafont Pairó.

In one study on Mesozoic mammal mandibles, it plots with carnivorous rather than insectivorous or herbivorous species.

In 2011 a second species of Crusafontia was named, C. amoae, based on two upper molar teeth from Galve. However, this was synonymised with the original species in 2021.

References

Dryolestida
Prehistoric mammal genera
Cretaceous mammals of Europe
Cretaceous Spain
Fossils of Spain
Camarillas Formation
La Huérguina Formation
Fossil taxa described in 1969